Theodore "Touchdown Teddy" Robert McKnight (born February 26, 1954) is a former professional American football running back in the NFL for the Kansas City Chiefs and Buffalo Bills. He played college football at the University of Minnesota Duluth and is one of six players to attend Minnesota-Duluth and play in the NFL. Of the six players, he had the longest NFL career.

McKnight was drafted in the second round by the Oakland Raiders. 
Picked up by Kansas City, McKnight led the Chiefs in rushing in 1979 and 1980. He also led the Chiefs in receptions in 1979.

In 1978 McKnight led the NFL with a Chiefs record 6.0 yards per carry. 

He finished his NFL career with 2,344 rushing yards and 23 total touchdowns. 
His longest run was 84 yards in 1979 and was a Chiefs record until 2012. 
McKnight also caught 99 passes out of the backfield. He finished his career with 3499 career all purpose yards.

He is inducted to the Missouri Sports Hall of Fame, University of Minnesota Duluth Hall of Fame.

References

1954 births
Living people
Players of American football from Duluth, Minnesota
American football running backs
Minnesota Duluth Bulldogs football players
Kansas City Chiefs players
Buffalo Bills players
University of Minnesota Duluth alumni